Interleukin-12 subunit alpha (IL-12 p35) is a protein that in humans is encoded by the IL12A gene.

Function 

This gene encodes a subunit of the cytokine Interleukin 12 (IL-12) that acts on T and natural killer cells, and has a broad array of biological activities. The cytokine is a disulfide-linked heterodimer composed of the 35-kD subunit encoded by this gene, and a 40-kD subunit that is a member of the cytokine receptor family. This cytokine is required for the T-cell-dependent induction of interferon gamma (IFN-γ), and is important for the differentiation of both Th1 and Th2 cells. The responses of lymphocytes to this cytokine are mediated by the activator of transcription protein STAT4. Nitric oxide synthase 2A (NOS2A/NOS2) is found to be required for the signaling process of this cytokine in innate immunity.

References

Further reading